Lajoux may refer to:
 Lajoux, France, a commune in the Jura department, France
 Lajoux, Switzerland, a municipality in the canton of Jura, Switzerland